Max Barandun (25 October 1942 – 31 October 2010) was a Swiss sprinter. He competed in the men's 100 metres at the 1964 Summer Olympics.

References

1942 births
2010 deaths
Athletes (track and field) at the 1964 Summer Olympics
Swiss male sprinters
Olympic athletes of Switzerland
Place of birth missing